Hongnong (弘農) may refer to:
 Hongnong Commandery, a commandery of imperial China from Han dynasty to Tang dynasty.
 Yang Wu, also known as Hongnong, a kingdom in 10th-century China.